Dioxane tetraketone (or 1,4-dioxane-2,3,5,6-tetrone) is an organic compound with the formula C4O6.  It is an oxide of carbon (an oxocarbon), which can be viewed as the fourfold ketone of dioxane.  It can also be viewed as the cyclic dimer of oxiranedione (C2O3), the hypothetical anhydride of oxalic acid.

In 1998, Paolo Strazzolini and others synthesized this compound by reacting oxalyl chloride (COCl)2 or the bromide (COBr)2 with a suspension of silver oxalate (Ag2C2O4) in diethyl ether at −15 °C, followed by evaporation of the solvent at low temperature and pressure.  The substance is stable when dissolved in ether and trichloromethane at −30 °C, but decomposes into a 1:1 mixture of carbon monoxide (CO) and carbon dioxide (CO2) upon heating to 0 °C.  The stability and conformation of the molecule were also analyzed by theoretical methods.

References

See also
 1,2-Dioxetanedione

Oxocarbons
Dimers (chemistry)
Carboxylic anhydrides
Conjugated ketones